Apurba Sarkar is an Indian politician. He was elected to the West Bengal Legislative Assembly from Kandi constituency. He is President of NBSTC (North Bengal State Transport Corporation).

References

Members of the West Bengal Legislative Assembly
Trinamool Congress politicians from West Bengal
Living people
1964 births